Wang Fan is a Chinese astronomer, mathematician, politician, and writer of the state of Eastern Wu during the Three Kingdoms period of China.

Wang Fan, may also refer to:

Wan Fan (scholar), Chinese scholar and president of China Foreign Affairs University
Wang Fan (beach volleyball), Chinese beach volleyball player
Wang Fan (footballer), Chinese footballer